Jo Mi-ryung (born April 16, 1973) is a South Korean actress. She is best known as a supporting actress, in television dramas such as Dae Bak Family (2002), Passion (2004), I Love You (2008), The Slave Hunters (2010), and Can't Lose (2011).

Filmography

Television series

Film

Awards and nominations

References

External links 
 
 Jo Mi-ryung at Jump Entertainment 
 
 
 

1973 births
Living people
South Korean television actresses
South Korean film actresses
Seoul Institute of the Arts alumni
People from Seoul